Inquisitor varicosus is a species of sea snail, a marine gastropod mollusk in the family Pseudomelatomidae, the turrids and allies.

Description
The length of the shell varies between 40 mm and 60 mm.

The whorls are smooth near the suture, longitudinally ribbed below, with large rude scattered varices. The sinus is broad and rather deep. The ribs are grayish on a darker surface, sometimes entirely brown.

Distribution
This marine species occurs off the Philippines, Mauritius, Sulawesi, Indonesia, and Western Australia..

References

 Weinkauff. Martini-Chemn. Conch. Cab. Ed. II, Vol. IV, Pleurotoma, p. 85, PI. 18, fig. 6, 11
 Liu J.Y. [Ruiyu] (ed.). (2008). Checklist of marine biota of China seas. China Science Press. 1267 pp.

External links
  Hedley, C. 1922. A revision of the Australian Turridae. Records of the Australian Museum 13(6): 213-359, pls 42-56  
 
 
  Baoquan Li 李宝泉 & R.N. Kilburn, Report on Crassispirinae Morrison, 1966 (Mollusca: Neogastropoda: Turridae) from the China Seas; Journal of Natural History 44(11):699-740 · March 2010; DOI: 10.1080/00222930903470086

varicosus
Gastropods described in 1843